Enemy of the People: How Jacob Zuma stole South Africa and how the people fought back (2017) is a book by Adriaan Basson and Pieter du Toit, political journalists from South Africa about the creation by President Jacob Zuma of a patronage network embedded in the South African government; the process of state capture that took place under Zuma's leadership; those that supported Zuma and those that resisted. The book's publisher Jonathan Ball Publishers describes it as the "first definitive account of Zuma’s catastrophic misrule."  The book covers scandals such as the attempt by the Gupta family, on behalf of Jet Airways, to force the state owned carrier South African Airways to relinquish its air-rout between Johannesburg and Mumbai through the appointment of compliant government ministers.

References 

South African non-fiction books
Political books
Deep politics
2017 non-fiction books
Books about politics of South Africa
Investigative journalism
Non-fiction books about organized crime
Jacob Zuma
Works about corruption
Corruption in South Africa
Jonathan Ball Publishers books
Books about the African National Congress